The Brazil–Italy football rivalry, also known as the Clássico Mundial in Portuguese or the World Derby in English, is a football rivalry between the national football teams of Brazil and Italy, two of the most successful football nations in the world, having achieved nine World Cups between them. They have played against each other five times in the World Cup. Most notably, the 1970 World Cup Final and the 1994 World Cup Final in which Brazil won 4–1 in the former, and 3–2 on penalties after a goalless draw in the latter, as well as the semifinals of the 1938 World Cup and the final second group stage match of the 1982 World Cup won 3–2 by Italy. They have also met at two FIFA Confederations Cups as well as the 1976 U.S.A. Bicentennial Cup Tournament and the 1997 Tournoi de France.

Brazil have won a total of eight meetings, slightly edging the Italians at five wins.

The most recent meeting ended in a 4–2 victory for Brazil in Salvador, Brazil on 22 June 2013.

List of matches

Major encounters

1938 FIFA World Cup
During the 1938 World Cup semi-final on 16 June, nine minutes after Gino Colaussi's 51st-minute breakthrough, Giuseppe Meazza doubled Italy's lead from the penalty spot. While Meazza was getting ready to take the penalty, the elastic in his shorts snapped, causing the Inter Milan striker to hold them up with his left hand when taking the kick. Romeu scored a late Brazilian consolation as Italy went on to win the match 2–1 over Brazil and subsequently the World Cup in the final against Hungary for their second straight World Cup title.

1970 FIFA World Cup

Italy reached the final of the 1970 World Cup on 21 June by defeating West Germany 4–3 in one of the most memorable matches of all time, five of the seven goals coming in extra time. However, Ferruccio Valcareggi's men were beaten in Mexico City four days later. Roberto Boninsegna cancelled out Pelé's 18th-minute opener, Brazil scored three goals in the second half by Gérson, Jairzinho and Carlos Alberto, with no answer from Italy as Brazil went on to win 4–1 for their third World Cup title.

1978 FIFA World Cup
On 24 June, Brazil and Italy were matched up for the third-place match of the 1978 World Cup after both sides finished second in their respective groups in the second round. Brazil won the position of third place, knocking Italy to fourth after a 2–1 win with goals by Nelinho in the 64th minute and Dirceu in the 71st minute, although Italy's Franco Causio scored first in the 38th minute.

1982 FIFA World Cup

It was the final second round group stage match for Group C in the 1982 World Cup on 5 July. The match was won by Italy 3–2, with Italian striker Paolo Rossi scoring a hat-trick. The result eliminated Brazil from the tournament while Italy went on to win it. The match has been described as one of the greatest football matches of all time.

1994 FIFA World Cup

In the 1994 World Cup on 17 July, after 120 minutes of goalless action during the final at the Rose Bowl in Pasadena, California, United States, Italians Franco Baresi, Massaro and Roberto Baggio missed their penalty kicks as Brazil went on to win 3–2 in the resulting penalty shoot-out for their fourth World Cup title.

2009 FIFA Confederations Cup
On 21 June, Italy and Brazil were matched up for the final group game of the 2009 Confederations Cup, which saw Brazil advance with a win 3–0 with two goals by Luís Fabiano in the 37th minute and 43rd minute as well as an own goal by Italy's Andrea Dossena in the 45th minute. Since the United States won their final group match, they over took and eliminated Italy on goals scored, although level on points. Brazil went on to win the Confederations Cup for the third time.

2013 FIFA Confederations Cup
On 22 June, Italy and Brazil faced off in the following final group match of the 2013 Confederations Cup, with Brazil, yet again edging Italy, this time 4–2 with Brazilian goals by Dante in the final minute of stoppage time in the first half, Neymar in the 55th minute, and Fred in the 66th minute and the 89th minute, with Italian goals coming from Emanuele Giaccherini in the 51st minute and Giorgio Chiellini in the 71st minute. Italy still advanced from the group to beat out Uruguay in the third-place position, while Brazil went on to with the Confederations Cup for the 4th time after beating out Spain.

Overall statistics

* Brazil overcame Italy in the 1994 FIFA World Cup final via penalty shoot-out.

See also
 Brazil–Italy relations
 List of association football rivalries

References

External links

Brazil national football team rivalries
Italy national football team rivalries
International association football rivalries
Brazil–Italy relations
Brazil at the 1938 FIFA World Cup
Brazil at the 1970 FIFA World Cup
Brazil at the 1978 FIFA World Cup
Brazil at the 1982 FIFA World Cup
Brazil at the 1994 FIFA World Cup
Brazil at the 2009 FIFA Confederations Cup
Brazil at the 2013 FIFA Confederations Cup
Italy at the 1938 FIFA World Cup
Italy at the 1970 FIFA World Cup
Italy at the 1978 FIFA World Cup
Italy at the 1982 FIFA World Cup
Italy at the 1994 FIFA World Cup
Italy at the 2009 FIFA Confederations Cup
Italy at the 2013 FIFA Confederations Cup